Royal Air Force Bratton or more simply RAF Bratton is a former Royal Air Force station located at Bratton, Shropshire, England.

The following units were here at some point:
 No. 5 (Pilots) Advanced Flying Unit RAF
 No. 11 (Pilots) Advanced Flying Unit RAF
 No. 11 Service Flying Training School RAF
 No. 21 (Pilots) Advanced Flying Unit RAF

Current use

The site is used as farmland.

References

Bratton